Spencer Carbery (born November 9, 1981) is a Canadian former professional ice hockey left winger and is an assistant coach with the Toronto Maple Leafs.

Playing career
Born in Victoria, British Columbia, Carbery started his Junior Career with the Peninsula Panthers in the Vancouver Island Junior Hockey League in the 1999/00 season.  He was a key factor in the Club going to the League finals and put up 34 goals, 42 assists and 76 points to become the leading Rookie Scorer in the Panthers franchise history.  The record stood until being broken by Payton Braun in the 2021/22 season.  Carbery played junior hockey with the Cowichan Valley Capitals of the British Columbia Hockey League for the 2000–01 season, scoring a combined 58 points in goals and assists during regular season play.

In 2002, Carbery attended the University of Alaska Anchorage, where he netted 1 goal and 2 assists in 26 games. Carbery attended St. Norbert College from 2003 to 2006, finishing out his NCAA career with 103 points in goals and assists in the regular season.

Carbery turned pro in 2006, signing with the Tulsa Oilers of the Central Hockey League. During the 2006–07 season, he earned 44 points (16 goals, 28 assists) over 63 games in the regular season.

In 2007, Carbery moved to the ECHL, where he split the season between the Bakersfield Condors (18 games, 3 goals, 3 assists), the Stockton Thunder (20 games, 0 goals, 2 assists), and the Fresno Falcons (20 games, 2 goals, 2 assists). Carbery also saw playoff action with the Falcons in 2008, playing 1 game in the National Conference quarterfinals.

Carbery remained with the Falcons for the beginning of the 2008–09 season, pulling down 13 points in combined goals and assists over 29 games in the regular season. Following suspension of Falcons operations, Carbery joined the South Carolina Stingrays' roster, scoring 29 points (12 goals, 7 assists) over 39 games. Playoff action with the Stingrays culminated in 5 goals, 8 assists, and a Kelly Cup championship for Carbery.

On September 11, 2009, Carbery re-signed as a free agent on a one-year contract to return to South Carolina. In the 2009–10 season on January 7, 2010, Spencer was selected to represent the Stingrays as an alternate captain. To positive effect he quickly responded in achieving a Gordie Howe hat trick on January 16, 2010, against the Kalamazoo Wings. On January 25, 2010, his goal against the Reading Royals aided the Stingrays in tying the ECHL record for the most players with a point in one game. All 15 skaters registered a point in the 8-5 victory over the Royals.

Coaching career
On August 31, 2010, Carbery announced his retirement from professional hockey and was named the Stingrays' assistant coach. He served as assistant coach for the 2010–11 season, helping lead the team to a 37–29–3–3 regular season record and an appearance in the 2011 Kelly Cup playoffs.

After head coach Cail MacLean resigned to accept a position with the American Hockey League's Abbotsford Heat in July 2011, Carbery was named the team's sixth head coach and Director of Hockey Operations. At the age of 29, he was the youngest head coach in the ECHL at the time. He would eventually leave the Stingrays in 2016 to become head coach of the Saginaw Spirit in the Ontario Hockey League. After one season, he left the Spirit to become an assistant for the Providence Bruins in the American Hockey League (AHL).

Returning to the Washington Capitals farm system where he had begun his coaching career, he was announced to be the head coach of the Hershey Bears in the AHL on June 26, 2018. In 2021, he led the team to the Macgregor Kilpatrick Trophy in 2021, the AHL's regular season league championship, and won the Louis A. R. Pieri Memorial Award for coach of the year.

On July 17, 2021, he was hired as an assistant coach by the Toronto Maple Leafs.

Awards
ECHL 2013–14 Coach of the Year
Named to the NCHA All-Academic Team for 2004–05 and 2005–06.
Awarded the South Carolina Stingrays' first Jerry Zucker Community Service Award in March 2009.
Louis A. R. Pieri Memorial Award for coach of the year for the 2020–21 AHL season.

Personal life
Carbery was married in August 2009 to Casey Carbery.

Career statistics

References

External links
 

1982 births
Alaska Anchorage Seawolves men's ice hockey players
Bakersfield Condors (1998–2015) players
Canadian ice hockey left wingers
Cowichan Valley Capitals players
Fresno Falcons players
Ice hockey people from British Columbia
Living people
Sportspeople from Victoria, British Columbia
South Carolina Stingrays coaches
South Carolina Stingrays players
Stockton Thunder players
Tulsa Oilers (1992–present) players
Canadian expatriate ice hockey players in the United States
Canadian ice hockey coaches